Vesijärvi is a lake in Finland. It is located in the Pirkanmaa region and there mostly in the municipality of Kangasala and for a lesser part in the municipality of Orivesi.

The lake is part of Kokemäenjoki basin and a chain of lakes that consists of Längelmävesi, Vesijärvi, Roine, Pälkänevesi and Mallasvesi. This chain of lakes drains into Vanajavesi in Valkeakoski, and from southeast another chain of lakes, consisting of the lakes Lummene, Kuohijärvi, Kukkia, Iso-Roine, Hauhonselkä and Ilmoilanselkä joins into it. In Finnish the former chain of lakes is called Längelmäveden reitti and the latter Hauhon reitti as it runs through the former municipality of Hauho.

See also
List of lakes in Finland

References

Kokemäenjoki basin
Lakes of Kangasala